Sheikh Mohammed Ahmad Al-Jaber Al-Sabah (1909 – 4 April 1975) was the second son of Ahmad Al-Jaber Al-Sabah.

He was the first minister of defense, before the formation of the ministry itself. He was assigned this responsibility when the first council of ministers formed in 1962. He was reassigned to the post after the first elections for the National Assembly of Kuwait and remained in the post until 30 November 1964. The Kuwait Naval Base, formally the Mohammed Al-Ahmad Kuwait Naval Base, was named after him.

See also
Chief of the General Staff (Kuwait)
House of Sabah
List of emirs of Kuwait
Military of Kuwait

References

1909 births
1975 deaths
Government ministers of Kuwait
House of Al-Sabah
Defence ministers of Kuwait
Sons of monarchs